The 2021 24H Touring Car Endurance Series powered by Hankook was the sixth season of the Touring Car Endurance Series (TCES). Creventic was the organiser and promoter of the series. The races were contested with TCR Touring Cars, TCX cars and TC cars.

Calendar

Entry list

Race Results
Bold indicates overall winner.

Championship standings

Drivers' Overall

† – Drivers did not finish the race, but were classified as they completed over 60% of the class winner's race distance.

Teams' Overall

† – Drivers did not finish the race, but were classified as they completed over 60% of the class winner's race distance.

TCR Drivers'

† – Drivers did not finish the race, but were classified as they completed over 60% of the class winner's race distance.

TCR Teams'

† – Drivers did not finish the race, but were classified as they completed over 60% of the class winner's race distance.

TCX Drivers'

† – Drivers did not finish the race, but were classified as they completed over 60% of the class winner's race distance.

TCX Teams'

† – Drivers did not finish the race, but were classified as they completed over 60% of the class winner's race distance.

TC Drivers'

† – Drivers did not finish the race, but were classified as they completed over 60% of the class winner's race distance.

TC Teams'

† – Drivers did not finish the race, but were classified as they completed over 60% of the class winner's race distance.

See also
24H Series

Notes

References

External links

24H TCE
24H TCE
24H TCE